North Meath RFC is an Irish rugby team based in Kells, County Meath. They play in the North East McGee Cup & The Anderson Cup. They won The 2nd Towns cup in 2011. The club colours are black and yellow.
The club also has a Women's team, founded in November 2016 by John Fitzgerald and Victor Grey. They are currently in a Division 4 Development League playing under Manager John Fitzgerald and Coach Ben Traynor. Their captain in Maye Muldoon.

References
 http://www.leinsterrugby.ie/downloads/2008-Leinster-Cl-Contacts.pdf

External links
 North Meath RFC

Irish rugby union teams
Rugby clubs established in 2007
Rugby union clubs in County Meath